Paul Page (May 13, 1903 – April 28, 1974) was an American film actor.

Born Campbell U. Hicks, he was the son of Robert C. Hicks and Laura Conant Hicks.

Page attended Baltimore Polytechnic Institute and graduated from St. John's College in Annapolis with a degree in engineering.

On July 10, 1929, he married Ethel Allis.

Selected filmography

References

External links 

 

1903 births
1974 deaths
American male silent film actors
20th-century American male actors
Male actors from Birmingham, Alabama